Sivakasi is a town in Virudhunagar District in the Indian state of Tamil Nadu. The town is known for its firecracker, matchbox and printing industries. The major issues in the fireworks industry in Sivakasi are child labour and frequent accidents.

Background

The economy of Sivakasi is dependent on three major industries: firecrackers, matchbox manufacturing, and printing. The town has 520 registered printing industries, 53 match factories, 32 chemical factories, seven soda factories, four flour mills and two rice and oil mills. The town is the nodal center for firecracker manufacturing at the national level. Approximately 70% of the firecrackers and matches produced in India are from Sivakasi. The hot and dry climate of the town is conducive to the firecracker and matchbox making industries. The raw materials for these industries were procured from Sattur earlier but were discontinued due to the high power and production cost. The source of raw materials is Kerala and Andaman. The paper for the printing industry is procured from various states. The town is a major producer of diaries, contributing to 30% of the total diaries produced in India. Printing industry in the town was initially utilized for printing labels for the firecrackers and later evolved with modern machinery to grow as a printing hub. In 2012, all the industries suffered 15–20% production loss due to power shortage and escalating labor cost.

The major issues in the fireworks industry in Sivakasi is child labour and frequent accidents. In a blast in 1991 in a factory, 39 people were killed and 65 others were injured.
In July 2009, more than 40 people were killed in a fire accident in a firecracker unit. The police traced out unregistered units and irregularities that led to the accident. In a fire accident in August 2011, seven people were killed and five were seriously injured. A similar fire accident and blast in a private unit in September 2012 killed 40 people and injured 38 others. The common reasons cited for the accidents are inadequate training of workers and supervisors involved in different stages of production and marketing of firecracker items. Other reasons are found to be overstocking of explosives, raw material and finished goods, and employment of workers in excess of the permitted strength.

Fireworks incidents and explosions 
 Sri Krishna Fireworks – Namaskarithanpatti – 20.07.2009 
 Anil Fireworks - Keezha Tiruthangal  - 28.07.2009 
 Classic Fireworks - Meenampatti – 03.08.2009 
 Om Sakthi Fire works – Mudhalaipatti – 05.09.2012 
 Meenakshi Fireworks - Kichanayakkanpatti – 15.05.2013 
 Chidambaram Fireworks – Vilampatty – 22.08.2013 
 Jonal Fireworks – Chokkalingapuram – 25.02.2016 
 Krishnasamy Fireworks – Maraneri – 09.06.2016 
 Whole Sale Shop - Raghavendra Agency – Sivakasi – 20.10.2016 
 Nagamalli Fireworks - Vetrilai Oorani  - 11.03.2017 
 ARV fireworks – Ramuthevanpatti – 06.04.2018 
 SKS fireworks – Kakkivadanpatti – 06.04.2018 
Factory belonging to Krishnasamy Industries - Kakkivadanpatti - 08.09.2018

References

Virudhunagar district
Industrial fires and explosions in India